Osvaldo Alfredo Reig (14 August 1929 – 13 March 1992) was an Argentine biologist and paleontologist. He was born in Buenos Aires, Argentina.

He made numerous contributions in the fields of paleontology and biological evolution. He studied at the Universidad de La Plata, but did not complete his studies. Later he worked at the University of Buenos Aires in the Department of Biological Sciences working with the biological evolution of mammals. In 1966 he began work at the Museum of Comparative Zoology at Harvard University. He worked for almost fifteen years at the Central University of Venezuela and the Simón Bolívar University. In 1973 he received his PhD in Zoology and Paleontology from the University of London. Among the important papers he authored was the description of Herrerasaurus, one of the earliest dinosaurs known. Reig died in 1992.

See also
 :Category:Taxa named by Osvaldo Reig

References

1929 births
1992 deaths
20th-century Argentine zoologists
Argentine paleontologists
Paleozoologists
Taxonomists
Harvard University staff
Academic staff of the Central University of Venezuela
Alumni of the University of London
Foreign associates of the National Academy of Sciences